Mullinalaghta St Columba's are a Gaelic football club based in Mullinalaghta, County Longford, Ireland.

They are the 2021 Longford Senior Football Championship winners, having previously won the title in 1948, 1950, 2016, 2017 and 2018.

On the 9th of December 2018, they became the first Longford club to win the Leinster Senior Club Football Championship. They were the first Longford club to reach the Leinster final, and beat Kilmacud Crokes of Dublin on a scoreline of 1-8 to 1-6.

History
The club was founded in 1889 as Mullinalaghta Leaguers and competed in the first Longford Senior Football Championship in 1890.

The club's first recorded title was an intermediate title in 1931 as Mullinalaghta.

The club was noted for its success during the 1940s and 1950s, winning the senior league in 1945 & five in a row league titles (1947 to 1951) and senior championship titles in 1948 & 1950 at county level.

The club went through very lean times from the mid 1950s through till late 1970s.

St Columba's was added to the name to become Mullinalaghta St Columba's from 1955.

The club won a junior championship in 1977.

The club won an intermediate championship in 1990, Junior Championship in 1996, and Intermediate championships in 2000 & 2007.

Achievements
 Leinster Senior Club Football Championship (1) 2018		
 Longford Senior Football Championship (6) 1948, 1950, 2016, 2017. 2018, 2021
 Longford Intermediate Football Championship (4) 1931, 1990, 2000, 2007 
 Longford Junior Football Championship (2) 1977, 1996
 Leader Cup (Longford Senior League) (12) 1945, 1947, 1948, 1949, 1950, 1951, 2013, 2016, 2017, 2019, 2021, 2022
 Longford All-County League Division 1 (4) 2017, 2018, 2019, 2021

References

Gaelic games clubs in County Longford
Gaelic football clubs in County Longford